Tihlo is a dish from the historical Agame province in Tigray and  Akele Guzai province in Eritrea that consists of barley dough balls covered with meat and berbere based sauce often served as a snack. Tihlo is commonly consumed as a side dish or snack, especially in Tigrayan communities.

Overview
The barley grain is completely dehulled and milled. Tihlo is made using moistened roasted barley flour that is kneaded to a uniform consistency. The dough is then broken into small balls and laid out around a bowl of spicy meat stew. A two-pronged wooden fork is used to spear the ball and dip it into the stew.

Tihlo is commonly served on cultural holidays.

See also
Injera
List of African dishes
List of Ethiopian dishes and foods

References

Ethiopian cuisine
Eritrean cuisine